Damodar Valley Corporation (DVC) is a government-owned power generator which operates in the Damodar River area of West Bengal and Jharkhand states of India. The statutory corporation operates both thermal power stations and hydel power stations under the ownership of Ministry of Power, Government of India. DVC is headquartered in the Kolkata city of West Bengal, India.

History

The valley of the Damodar River was flood prone and the devastating flood of 1943, lead to the formation of the high-powered "Damodar Flood Enquiry Committee" by the government of Bengal. The committee recommended the formation of a body similar to the Tennessee Valley Authority of the United States. Subsequently, W.L. Voorduin, a senior engineer of TVA, was appointed to study the problem. He suggested the multi-purpose development of the valley as a whole in 1944. Damodar Valley Corporation was set up in 1948 as “the first multipurpose river valley project of independent India.”

DVC was formed with the central government and the governments of Bihar (later Jharkhand) and West Bengal participating in it. The main aims of the corporation were flood control, irrigation, generation and transmission of electricity, and year-round navigation. The corporation was also expected to provide indirect support for the over-all development of the region. However, while Voorduin had proposed the construction of eight dams, DVC built only four.

Mr. Voorduin's "Preliminary Memorandum" suggested a multipurpose development plan designed for achieving flood control, irrigation, power generation and navigation in the Damodar Valley. Four consultants appointed by the Government of India examined it. They also approved the main technical features of Voorduin's scheme and recommended early initiation of construction beginning with Tilaiya to be followed by Maithon. By April 1947, full agreement was practically reached between the three Governments of Central, West Bengal and Bihar on the implementation of the scheme and in March 1948, the Damodar Valley Corporation Act (Act No. XIV of 1948) was passed by the Central Legislature, requiring the three Governments, The Central Government and the State Governments of West Bengal and Bihar  to participate jointly for the purpose of building the Damodar Valley Corporation. The Corporation came into existence on 7 July 1948 as the first multipurpose river valley project of independent India.

The first dam was built across the Barakar River at Tilaiya and inaugurated in 1953. The second dam, Konar Dam, across the Konar River was inaugurated in 1955. The third dam across the Barakar River at Maithon was inaugurated in 1957. The fourth dam across the Damodar at Panchet was inaugurated in 1959.

Command area: 24,235 km2 spread across the Damodar basin.
Jharkhand: 2 districts fully (Dhanbad and Bokaro) and parts of 9 districts (Hazaribagh, Koderma, Chatra, Ramgarh, Palamau, Ranchi, Lohardaga, Giridih, and Dumka) 
West Bengal: 6 districts (Purba Bardhhaman, Paschim Bardhhaman, Hooghly, Howrah, Bankura and Purulia)

DVC plants

Infrastructure

DVC developed and expanded its infrastructure to six thermal power stations (6750 MW) and three hydro-electric power stations with a capacity of 147.2 MW which contribute to a total installed capacity of 6897.2 MW. Presently DVC has 49 sub-stations and receiving stations more than 8390-circuit km of transmission and distribution lines. DVC has also four dams, a barrage and a network of canals (2494 km) that play an effective role in water management. The construction of check dams, development of forests and farms and upland and wasteland treatment developed by DVC play a vital role in eco-conservation and environmental management.

Water management

DVC has a network of four dams - Tilaiya and Maithon on Barakar River, Panchet on Damodar river and Konar on Konar river. Besides, Durgapur barrage and the canal network, handed over to the Government of West Bengal in 1964, remained a part of the total system of water management. DVC dams are capable of moderating floods of 6.51 lac cusec to 2.5 lac cusecs.

Four multipurpose dams were constructed during the period 1948 to 1959:
 Tilaiya Dam (1953)
 Konar Dam (1955)
 Maithon Dam (1957)
 Panchet Dam (1959)

Flood reserve capacity of 1,292 mcm has been provided in 4 reservoirs, which can moderate a peak flood of 18,395 cumecs to a safe carrying capacity of 7,076 cumecs. 419 mcm of water is stored in the 4 DVC reservoirs to supply 680 cusecs of water to meet industrial, municipal and domestic requirements in West Bengal & Jharkhand. The Durgapur barrage on river Damodar was constructed in 1955 for the supply of irrigation water to the districts of Burdwan, Bankura & Hooghly.

 Irrigation Command Area (Gross): 
 Irrigation Potential Created: 
 Canals: 

 of land in the upper valley is being irrigated, every year by lift irrigation with the water available from 16,000 (approx) check dams constructed by DVC.

Joint venture projects
Maithon Power Limited
A joint venture company by DVC and Tata Power has been formed to implement 1,050 MW Maithon Right Bank Thermal Power Project for meeting the energy needs of power deficient regions on export basis.

Bokaro Power Supply Corporation Limited (BPSCL)
A joint venture  of DVC and SAIL has been established to operate and maintain the captive power and steam generation plant, hived off by SAIL and its Bokaro Steel Plant and supply power and steam exclusively to Bokaro Steel Ltd.

DVC EMTA Coal Mines Limited
A joint venture company formed with Eastern Minerals & Trading Agency for development and operation of Captive Coal Mine Blocks and supply of coal exclusively to DVC Thermal Power Projects of 10th and 11th plan.

Mining & Allied Machinery Corporation (MAMC)
The Mining and Allied Machinery Corporation (MAMC) in Durgapur —one of the PSU's in India set up under the rupee-rouble agreement and enjoying Soviet patronage in the early sixties. Bharat Earth Movers has the highest stake (48%) in the consortium while the other two PSUs — DVC and Coal India — have 26% stake each.

Notes

External links

 DVC Website
 moneycontrol.com
 powermin.nic.in
 economictimes.indiatimes.com
 ndtv.com

Electric-generation companies of India
Jharkhand
Companies based in Kolkata
Dams in Bihar
Dams in Jharkhand
Dams in West Bengal
Energy companies established in 1948
Ministry of Power (India)
1948 establishments in West Bengal